The 1971 Cal Lutheran Kingsmen football team was an American football team that represented California Lutheran University as an independent during the 1971 NAIA Division II football season. In their tenth season under head coach Bob Shoup, the Kingsmen compiled an undefeated 8–0–2 record and won the NAIA Division II national championship, defeating , 30–14, in the championship game.

Shoup was named NAIA Coach of the Year. Key players included quarterback Ralph Miller.

The team played its home games at Thousand Oaks High School in Thousand Oaks, California.

Schedule

References

California Lutheran
Cal Lutheran Kingsmen football seasons
NAIA Football National Champions
College football undefeated seasons
California Lutheran Kingsmen football